Derrick Wayne McKey (born October 10, 1966) is an American former basketball player who played most of his National Basketball Association (NBA) career at the small forward and the power forward positions.

Early life and college career

McKey attended Meridian High School in his Mississippi hometown, where he excelled on the team's basketball squad.  In addition to being a star basketball player in high school, he was a shortstop on the baseball team despite being .  He attended the University of Alabama for three years, leading the Tide to a regional No. 2 seed in 1986–87 and to the Sweet 16 (where they were eliminated by Providence). He played for the US national team in the 1986 FIBA World Championship, winning the gold medal.

NBA career

He declared for the NBA after his junior season and was selected by the Seattle SuperSonics with the ninth overall pick of the 1987 NBA draft, ahead of, notably, Reggie Miller, Horace Grant and Reggie Lewis. In the 1988–89 season, McKey averaged 15.9 PPG, his best scoring average in a season.

McKey spent the following six seasons in Seattle, where he was known as one third of the "Big Mac" team of the late 1980s and early 1990s Seattle SuperSonics, the others being Nate McMillan and Xavier McDaniel.  At the start of the 1993–94 NBA season he was traded to the Indiana Pacers along with teammate Gerald Paddio for Detlef Schrempf.  After years of playoff disappointments, he and the Pacers finally reached the NBA Finals in 2000, before losing to the Los Angeles Lakers.  He then spent the 2001–2002 season, the last of his career, with the Philadelphia 76ers.

Style and Career
At 6'10", McKey was mostly known for his defensive skills, his emphasis on teamwork play, and his versatility, which allowed him to guard opposing players of any position. Consequently, he was elected twice to the All-NBA Second Defensive Team. These abilities were the prime reason why coach Larry Brown wanted him in Indiana. He was also a smart, team-oriented player, shooting wisely (.486 for his career) and had a knack for passing.

References

External links

1966 births
Living people
1986 FIBA World Championship players
20th-century African-American sportspeople
21st-century African-American people
African-American basketball players
Alabama Crimson Tide men's basketball players
All-American college men's basketball players
American men's basketball players
Basketball players from Mississippi
Competitors at the 1986 Goodwill Games
FIBA World Championship-winning players
Indiana Pacers players
Philadelphia 76ers players
Power forwards (basketball)
Seattle SuperSonics draft picks
Seattle SuperSonics players
Small forwards
Sportspeople from Meridian, Mississippi
United States men's national basketball team players